, "A Portrait of Shunkin", is an opera by Minoru Miki, with Japanese libretto by .

It premiered in Tokyo on 24 November, 1975.  It was composed earlier that year. Shunkinshō is based on the novella of the same name by Jun'ichirō Tanizaki (谷崎潤一郎). 

The vocal score is published by Zen-On Music Company Ltd.

Roles

Synopsis
Set in 19th-century Osaka, the three-act opera tells the story of a love affair between Sasuke and blind koto teacher Shunkin, with the opposition of Sasuke's rich suitor Ritarō.

References
 Miki, Minoru by Masakata Kanazawa, in 'The New Grove Dictionary of Opera', ed. Stanley Sadie (London, 1992)

External links
 Operas of Minoru Miki
 Shunkinshō information page at Minoru Miki website (in Japanese)

Japanese-language operas
Operas set in Japan
Operas by Miki Minoru
1975 operas
Operas